{{DISPLAYTITLE:Delta2 Chamaeleontis}}

Delta2 Chamaeleontis, Latinized from δ2 Chamaeleontis, is a solitary star located in the southern circumpolar constellation of Chamaeleon. It has an apparent visual magnitude of 4.42, which is bright enough for the star to seen with the naked eye. Based upon an annual parallax shift of 9.30 mas, it is located around 351 light years from the Sun. This star is one of two stars named Delta Chamaeleontis, the other being the fainter Delta1 Chamaeleontis located about 6 arcminutes away. Delta Chamaeleontis forms the southernmost component of the constellation's "dipper" or bowl. Together with Gamma Chamaeleontis, they point to a spot that is within 2° of the south celestial pole.

This is a B-type main sequence star with a stellar classification of B3 V. However, Hiltner et al. (1969) give a classification of B2.5 IV, which would suggest it is a more evolved subgiant star. It is estimated to have five times the mass of the Sun and 3.9 times the Sun's radius. With an age of 32.6 million years, it is radiating over 500 times the solar luminosity from its outer atmosphere at an effective temperature of 15,873 K. There is a 70% likelihood that this star is a member of Gould's Belt.

References

Chamaeleontis, Delta2
Chamaeleon (constellation)
Chamaeleontis, Delta2
Durchmusterung objects
052633
04234
093845
B-type subgiants